Matty Beharrell (born 29 March 1994) is a professional rugby league footballer who plays for Dewsbury Rams in RFL Championship.

Beharrell started his career at Hull Kingston Rovers' first team where he was the under-18 winner of the 2012 Man of Steel Awards winner in 2012. He came through Hull KR's academy, and was signed onto a professional contract in 2012. His only Super League appearance to date, has come in Hull KR's record 84–6 loss to Wigan. He is just , which makes him the smallest player to have played in Super League, one foot and one inch smaller than Rob Burrow.

While at Hull KR, Beharrell spent two season at Newcastle Thunder on dual registration terms before joining Newcastle on a one-year contract.
In 2015 Beharrell joined Swinton Lions where he spent one season before moving to Keighley Cougars for the start of the 2017 season.  Beharell left Keighley in the middle of the 2018 season to join Doncaster for the rest of the 2018 season and 2019.

References

1993 births
Living people
Dewsbury Rams players
Doncaster R.L.F.C. players
English rugby league players
Hull Kingston Rovers players
Hunslet R.L.F.C. players
Keighley Cougars players
Newcastle Thunder players
Rugby league halfbacks
Rugby league players from Yorkshire
Swinton Lions players